Frank Armstrong may refer to:
Frank Crawford Armstrong (1835–1909), Confederate general during the American Civil War
Frank P. Armstrong (c. 1859–1923), Canadian steamboat captain
Frank Jeremiah Armstrong (c. 1877–1946), American physician
Frank A. Armstrong (1902–1969), United States Air Force general 
Frankie Armstrong (born 1941), English singer and voice coach
Frank Armstrong III (born 1944), American financial advisor

See also
Francis Armstrong (disambiguation)